Alessia Iezzi (born 23 July 1996) is an Italian sport shooter.

She participated at the 2018 ISSF World Shooting Championships, winning a medal.

References

External links

Living people
1996 births
Italian female sport shooters
Trap and double trap shooters
Sportspeople from Chieti